Gunawanti is a small village around 10 kilometers away from Honavar, Uttara Kannada, Karnataka. It is famous for its water tank that people from the world over visit for swimming and bathing.

Villages in Uttara Kannada district